Colegio Marista de Guaynabo is a private Roman Catholic school in Puerto Rico conducted by the Marist Brothers. It is one of the many Marist schools that take place within 80 countries around the world, being this one the first one to be located in the island of Puerto Rico.

History
In 1963, a group of families interested in having a catholic education for their boys, expressed their interest to the Archbishop of San Juan, Monsignor Jaime Dávila  for the creation of the school.
On September 2, 1963 Hno. David Mediavilla and Hno. Silvio Salicrup, delegates for the Order’s Superiors, arrived to evaluate the possibilities of making these families’ desires a reality.
On November 11, 1963, the news of approval for the foundation of the school arrives. The school had its first settling in the residence of the Architect Jorge Ramírez de Arellano, in Calle J, Garden Hills.
In August 1964, Colegio Marista started its educational history as boys only school, with 188 students for the first six grades. School population grew rapidly, accounting for 400 students in 1968. This growth seeded the construction of its new and actual facilities in Alturas de Torrimar, Guaynabo.

Today, Colegio Marista has excellent facilities that, along with its religious leaders, faculty and staff, provide education for 1500 boy and girl students. Their education is based on a constructivist and humanist curriculum, updated to meet the needs of current times. The Marist Brothers have a long rich tradition of excellent education around the world; locally, each year graduating students are accepted into the most prestigious colleges and universities in Puerto Rico and in the United States.

Most recently, the prestigious school has been awarded with the Iberoamerican Educational Excellence Award. This act, realized in August 2013, also proclaimed the institution as an Honorary Member of the Iberoamerican Council in recognition of the realized pro educational labor throughout the years.

Extracurricular activities
 Seahawks Chronicle (High School Publication)
 La Palestra (High School Publication)
 Il Giornalino (Middle School Publication)
 Miniaturas (Elementary School Publication)
 Consejo de Estudiantes (Student Council) 
 National Jr. Honor Society / National Honor Society 
 Club Modelo Naciones Unidas (Model United Nations) 
 Coro de Niños 
 Coro de Superior 
 Pro-Arte (Art implementation club - includes dancing and music) 
 Acuarela (Visual arts club)  
 Teatro (Drama Club) 
 Banda  
 Forensics League 
 Oratoria 
 Club de Matemáticas (Mathematics Club) 
 Club Del Lay-tee-go (Latigo)
 Club de Ciencias (Science Club) 
 Science Bowl / Society of Hispanic Professional Engineers (SHPE) 
 Biología Tropical (Tropical Biology) 
 Ornitología (Ornithology Research Association)  
 Tecnología (Technology) 
 Conciencia Verde (Environmental Conscience) 
 Club de Tierra Verde
 Club de Anuario (Yearbook)
 Círculo de Lectores (Reading Organization) 
 Solidaridad (Solidarity Club) 
 Orientación (College Orientation Club) 
 Asistentes de Biblioteca (Library Assistants)
 Juventud Marista (Spirit Organization) 
 Movimiento Infantil Amigos en Marcha
 Movimiento Infantil Maristas en Marcha
 Movimiento Juvenil Ciudad Nueva
 Movimiento Remar
 Spelling Bee

Notable alumni
 Ricky Rosselló, former governor of Puerto Rico
 Luis Fortuño, former governor of Puerto Rico
 Jaime Morgan Stubbe, former Executive Director of the Puerto Rico Maritime Authority
 Pedro Pierluisi, current governor of Puerto Rico, former resident commissioner
 Luis G. Rivera Marín, former secretary of state of Puerto Rico
 Paul Bouche, Television Personality and Producer

References

External links
 Colegio Marista Guaynabo. The school's main web site.
 Asociación Puertorriqueña de Ex-Alumnos Maristas. Alumni web site.
 The Marist Brothers. Marist Brothers web site.

Marist Brothers schools